Courtney Lee Sarault (born April 24, 2000) is a Canadian short track speed skater.

Career

Junior
Sarault competed at the 2015 Canada Games at the age of 14. She placed 30th, 8th, and 7th in 500m, 1000m and 1500m, respectively, and won a silver medal in the 3000m relay.

Sarault participated in the 2017 World Junior Championships. She had her breakout moment at the 2018 World Junior Championships, where she finished second overall after winning two silver medals in the 1000m and 1500m. She also captured gold with the 3000m relay team. Sarault was named Short Track Rising Star of the Year by Speed Skating Canada.

Sarault won a bronze medal in 1500m at the 2019 World Junior Championships.

Senior
Sarault made her world cup debut during the 2018–19 season and won her first-ever World Cup medal in 1500m in Calgary. She made her world championship debut at the 2019 World Short Track Speed Skating Championships, winning a bronze medal in the 3000m relay. At the inaugural Four Continents Short Track Speed Skating Championships in 2020, Sarault won 500m bronze and 1000m silver to finish third overall behind Choi Min-jeong and Seo Whi-Min of South Korea. 

Sarault finished second overall behind Suzanne Schulting at the 2021 World Championships; Sarault won 1500m silver and 1000m bronze at the only international short track event of the season. 

Sarault was named to Team Canada and will make her Olympic debut at the 2022 Beijing Olympic Games in February.

Personal life
Sarault is the daughter of former NHL player Yves Sarault. She began skating at a very young age and took up speed skating at the age of 7.

References

External links

2000 births
Living people
Canadian female short track speed skaters
Four Continents Short Track Speed Skating Championships medalists
Olympic short track speed skaters of Canada
Short track speed skaters at the 2022 Winter Olympics
Sportspeople from Grand Rapids, Michigan
World Short Track Speed Skating Championships medalists
21st-century Canadian women